The Sierra Madre shrew mouse (Soricomys musseri)  is a species of mammal from the Philippines.

References

Rats of Asia
Soricomys
Endemic fauna of the Philippines
Fauna of Luzon
Rodents of the Philippines